is a Japanese footballer who plays as a centre back for J2 League club Fujieda MYFC, on loan from Urawa Reds.

Career statistics

Club
.

References

External links

2003 births
Living people
Association football people from Wakayama Prefecture
Japanese footballers
Japan youth international footballers
Association football defenders
Urawa Red Diamonds players
Fujieda MYFC players